The 1973 FIBA Europe Under-16 Championship (known at that time as 1973 European Championship for Cadets) was the second edition of the FIBA Europe Under-16 Championship. The cities of Summonte and Angri, in Italy, hosted the tournament. The Soviet Union won their first title.

Teams

Preliminary round
The sixteen teams were allocated in two groups of eight teams each.

Group A

Group B

Knockout stage

13th–16th playoffs

9th–12th playoffs

5th–8th playoffs

Championship

Final standings

References
FIBA Archive
FIBA Europe Archive

FIBA U16 European Championship
1973–74 in European basketball
1973 in Italian sport
International youth basketball competitions hosted by Italy